In computer science, the lexicographically minimal string rotation or lexicographically least circular substring is the problem of finding the rotation of a string possessing the lowest lexicographical order of all such rotations. For example, the lexicographically minimal rotation of "bbaaccaadd" would be "aaccaaddbb". It is possible for a string to have multiple lexicographically minimal rotations, but for most applications this does not matter as the rotations must be equivalent. Finding the lexicographically minimal rotation is useful as a way of normalizing strings. If the strings represent potentially isomorphic structures such as graphs, normalizing in this way allows for simple equality checking.
A common implementation trick when dealing with circular strings is to concatenate the string to itself instead of having to perform modular arithmetic on the string indices.

Algorithms

The Naive Algorithm
The naive algorithm for finding the lexicographically minimal rotation of a string is to iterate through successive rotations while keeping track of the most lexicographically minimal rotation encountered. If the string is of length , this algorithm runs in  time in the worst case.

Booth's Algorithm
An efficient algorithm was proposed by Booth (1980).
The algorithm uses a modified preprocessing function from the Knuth-Morris-Pratt string search algorithm. The failure function for the string is computed as normal, but the string is rotated during the computation so some indices must be computed more than once as they wrap around. Once all indices of the failure function have been successfully computed without the string rotating again, the minimal lexicographical rotation is known to be found and its starting index is returned. The correctness of the algorithm is somewhat difficult to understand, but it is easy to implement.

def least_rotation(s: str) -> int:
    """Booth's lexicographically minimal string rotation algorithm."""
    n = len(s)
    f = [-1] * (2 * n)
    k = 0
    for j in range(1, 2 * n):
        i = f[j - k - 1]
        while i != -1 and s[j % n] != s[(k + i + 1) % n]:
            if s[j % n] < s[(k + i + 1) % n]:
                k = j - i - 1
            i = f[i]
        if i == -1 and s[j % n] != s[(k + i + 1) % n]:
            if s[j % n] < s[(k + i + 1) % n]:
                k = j
            f[j - k] = -1
        else:
            f[j - k] = i + 1
    return k
Booth's algorithm runs in  time, where  is the length of the string. The algorithm performs at most  comparisons in the worst case, and requires auxiliary memory of length  to hold the failure function table.

Shiloach's Fast Canonization Algorithm

Shiloach (1981)
proposed an algorithm improving on Booth's result in terms of performance. It was observed that if there are q equivalent lexicographically minimal rotations of a string of length n, then the string must consist of q equal substrings of length d=n/q. The algorithm requires only n + d/2 comparisons and constant space in the worst case.

The algorithm is divided into two phases. The first phase is a quick sieve which rules out indices that are obviously not starting locations for the lexicographically minimal rotation. The second phase then finds the lexicographically minimal rotation start index from the indices which remain.

Duval's Lyndon Factorization Algorithm
Duval (1983)
proposed an efficient algorithm involving the factorization of the string into its component Lyndon words, which runs in linear time with a constant memory requirement.

Variants
Shiloach (1979)
proposed an algorithm to efficiently compare two circular strings for equality without a normalization requirement. An additional application which arises from the algorithm is the fast generation of certain chemical structures without repetitions.

See also
 Lyndon word
 Knuth-Morris-Pratt algorithm

References

Problems on strings
Lexicography
Articles with example code